Frank Claussen (born 19 March 1976 in Stavanger) is a Norwegian heavy metal guitarist. From 1997 to 2010 he played in Theatre of Tragedy, and with them  released six studio albums, a live album and several studio EP's.

With Theatre of Tragedy

Aégis (1998)
Musique (2000)
Closure: Live - Live (2001)
Inperspective - Compilation EP (2001)
Assembly (2002)
Two Originals - Compilation (2003)
Storm (2006)
Forever Is the World(2009)
Addenda-EP (2010)

Singles

"Cassandra" (1998)
"Image" (2000)
"Machine" (2001)
"Let You Down" (2002)
"Envision" (2002)
"Storm" (2006)
"Addenda" (2010)

References 

1976 births
Living people
Norwegian heavy metal guitarists
Musicians from Stavanger
Theatre of Tragedy members